Donhead is an all-male private, preparatory day school located in Wimbledon, in the London Borough of Merton. The school is under the governance of the Jesuits, a Catholic religious order founded by Ignatius of Loyola in 1540. Donhead takes boys aged 4 to 11, after which they often continue their secondary education at various independent schools across London and Catholic public schools such as the Oratory School and Stonyhurst College.

History

The name Donhead perhaps originates from the Anglo-Saxon "head" meaning top and "don" meaning hill – "the top of the hill" and was first occupied by a barrister, a Mr Oliver Haynes. From 1880, it was owned by Mary Arnold. Until 1902, she used the building as a school for ladies. In 1932, the owner Henry Small left to the Jesuits after his wife died. The first headmaster was Fr Miller. Donhead's first pupils consisted of three classes named Elements, Preparatory, and Lower Preparatory, and numbered approximately 67 boys in total. The first day of the school was 5 September 1933.

From the late 1980s, Merton London Borough Council decided to close middle schools, resulting in the lowering of the age when students would go from Donhead to Wimbledon College from 13 years old to 11 years old. After this lowering of the top age group, like other schools in the borough, Donhead started admitting pupils at a lower age, so that they would still be at Donhead for the same amount of years.

Recent
In 2011, the school's Rugby Union Under 11A team were the National champions. They beat Blundell's in the final.

In September 2018, the school's ten-year £8m facilities development plan was completed. The school had a new chapel built that has capacity for 50 pupils, and uses the Donhead has more than doubled in size between 2006 and 2016.

Traditions 
The school runs over three terms: michaelmas, lent and trinity. Following Jesuit teaching, students are expected to sign off with the Latin inscriptions AMDG (Ad maiorem Dei gloriam) and LDS (Laus Deo Semper) before and after finishing each piece of work they complete. Each year is known by a name, drawn from the Jesuit Ratio Studiorum, for the prep school: Year 3 (Lower Prep 1), Year 4 (Lower Prep 2), Year 5 (Prep) and Year 6 (Elements).

The 1st XV kit acquires and extra red hoop in addition to the blue and white resulting in a tri-colour jersey.

Old Wimbledonians Association

The Old Wimbledonians Association (OWA) came into being in 1905 and was founded by old boys of its Alma Mater, Wimbledon College. Members of the OWA can be old boys of either Wimbledon College or Donhead Preparatory School.

Notable alumni 
 Fr Peter Milward, Jesuit scholar (literature)
 Donal Donat Conor Bradley, physicist
Michael Kenny (political scientist)
 Danny Cipriani, English rugby union player
 Tom Holland, actor and dancer
 Sir Michael Quinlan, British civil servant
 The Rt Rev Nicholas Hudson, Auxiliary Bishop of the Roman Catholic Archdiocese of Westminster

Headmasters 
      
 Fr Edmund Millar, SJ (1933–1939)
 Fr Francis Moran, SJ (1939–1942)
 Fr Edmund Basset, SJ (1942–1945)
 Fr Christopher Farwell, SJ (1945–1949)
 Fr Bernard Egan, SJ (1949–1971)
 Fr Philip Wetz, SJ (1971–1985) 
 Mr Denis O'Leary (1985–1997)
 Mr Chris McGrath (1997–2017)
 Mr Philip Barr (2017–present)

See also
 
 List of Jesuit sites in the United Kingdom
 List of Jesuit schools

References

External links
 Old Wimbledonians Association website
 Donhead profile, isc.co.uk; accessed 30 September 2014.
 ISI Inspection Reports; accessed 30 September 2014,

1933 establishments in England
Educational institutions established in 1933
Private boys' schools in London
Private schools in the London Borough of Merton
Jesuit schools in the United Kingdom
Preparatory schools in London
Roman Catholic private schools in the Archdiocese of Southwark
Buildings and structures in Wimbledon, London